Cincinnati Buckeyes may refer to:
 Cincinnati Buckeyes (19th century team), an amateur team formed a year before the Cincinnati Reds
 the Cleveland Buckeyes, a Negro league team who played in Cincinnati as the Cincinnati Buckeyes in 1942 before moving to Cleveland
 the Cincinnati Buckeyes, a 21st-century member of the Vintage Base Ball Association